Dingwall Pursuivant of Arms is a current Scottish pursuivant of arms of the Court of the Lord Lyon.

Dingwall Pursuivant was formerly a private officer of arms in the service of the Lord of the Isles, but along with Kintyre Pursuivant, Ross Herald, and Islay Herald became an officer of arms to the Scottish Crown when the Lord of the Isles forfeited his estates and titles to James IV of Scotland in 1493.

The badge of office is A mullet within an annulet rayonnee Or and enfiled in chief of a coronet of four fleurs-de-lys (two visible) and four crosses pattee (one and two halves visible) Or.

The office is currently vacant.

Holders of the office

See also
Officer of Arms
Pursuivant
Court of the Lord Lyon
Heraldry Society of Scotland

References

External links
The Court of the Lord Lyon



Court of the Lord Lyon
Offices of arms